Irving Lanouette Price (September 21, 1884 – November 23, 1976) was an American toy manufacturer.

Price was born in Worcester, Massachusetts in 1884 had a successful career as an executive with Woolworth, retired at an early age and was elected Mayor of East Aurora, New York.

He was the co-founder and co-eponym of Fisher-Price Toys in 1930. On 23 February 1909, he married the children's book illustrator and artist Margaret Evans Price (1888-1973). Margaret was a member of the wealthy Evans family of New York who for a time had an effective monopoly on the building material industry in that city.

In 2014, debates flared on whether his former home in East Aurora should be demolished or preserved for local historical purposes. The owner of the house wants to knock it down to make room for a parking lot.

References

1884 births
1976 deaths
Fisher-Price
Businesspeople from Worcester, Massachusetts
People from East Aurora, New York
20th-century American businesspeople